The slaty-backed thornbill (Acanthiza robustirostris) is a species of bird in the family Acanthizidae.
It is endemic to Australia.

References

slaty-backed thornbill
Endemic birds of Australia
slaty-backed thornbill
Taxonomy articles created by Polbot